The Central Council of German Sinti and Roma is a German Romani rights group based in Heidelberg, Germany. It is headed by Romani Rose, who lost 13 of his close family in the Holocaust.

Description
The Central Council was founded in 1982. It is the union of the umbrella organisations of the four national autochthonous minorities which belong to the German nation and have always been resident and here: The Domowina of the Sorbs, the Friesian Council, the South Schleswig Association of the Danish minority and the Central Council of German Sinti and Roma. Along with delegates of minorities from the United States, Mexico, Argentina, Japan, India, Sri Lanka, France and the Netherlands Rose is also a member of the management committee of the International Movement Against Discrimination and Racism (IMADR) founded in Tokyo in 1988.

For two and a half decades – since June 1979 to be more exact – Romani Rose has led the work for the civil rights of German Sinti and Roma before the eyes of the German as well as the international public; he has also fought for their protection from racism and discrimination and for compensation for the survivors of the Holocaust, at the same time announcing the magnitude and the historical importance of the genocide of 500,000 Sinti and Roma in
National Socialist occupied Europe. In May 1995, in cooperation with the member organisations of the Central Council, Rose achieved recognition for German Sinti and Roma as a national minority in Germany with their own minority language, connected with their goal of equal participation in social and political life.

Civil rights work 
To the first important steps of this civil rights work belong:
the hunger strike by 12 Sinti in the former KZ Dachau on Easter 1980, organised and participated in by Rose, to get international attention for the genocide and to protest against the continued use of "Gypsy-Race"-files of the Reichs Security Main Office by German police and other authorities decades after the end of the war;
the Central Council of German Sinti and Roma, co-founded on 6 February 1982 by Rose and since then led by him, and until the year 2000 the only and until today the most influential umbrella organisation of state and regional associations of German Sinti and Roma;
the delegation of German Sinti and Roma led by Rose to meet the former Chancellor Helmut Schmidt, who proclaimed the historically important and internationally binding recognition of the National Socialist crimes against Sinti and Roma as genocide determined by their so-called "Rasse" (race).

In the following years the Central Council drew attention to its demands again and again in the form of protests, press conferences, and events, each under the management of Rose.
Examples of such are:
1) The protest action organised by Rose by 220 Sinti and Roma on 28 January 1983 (to the occasion of the 50th anniversary of the seizing of power by the Nazis) at the Federal Bureau of Criminal Investigation against the racially discriminating publications and criminal investigation department learning materials on Sinti and Roma with formulations taken from NS literature;
2) The action with 400 Sinti and Roma KZ survivors in Bonn on 20 November 1986 in connection with Rose's comments in front of a Federal press conference to the first 525 cases of withheld payments of compensation under the Federal Compensation Law, handed over at the office of the Chancellor;
3) The until now unique memorial Mass initiated by Rose, given by the Bishop Anton Schlembach in the Speyer cathedral on 13 March 1988, the 45th anniversary of the deportation of 23,000 European Sinti and Roma to Auschwitz. On Rose's invitation, 1,500 Sinti and Roma from all over Germany and personalities such as the then President of the Upper House Bernhard Vogel and the then President of the Lower House Prof. Rita Süssmuth came to the Mass;
4) The demonstration by 250 Sinti and Roma Holocaust survivors, led by Rose, at the Federal Ministry of Finance for the following through of equal payment of compensation for forced work to the ca. 1,800 KZ survivors represented by the Central Council to that end in the years 2002 to 2006;
5) Public meetings, gaining signatures on petitions (with 2,124 German Sinti and Roma, among which were 1,520 KZ survivors), other actions and many press appointments since 1989 demanding the erection of the Holocaust memorial for murdered Sinti and Roma on the position between the Reichstag and the Brandenburg Gate agreed to for 1994.

The two and a half decades of non-stop engagement for the compensation of KZ victims gained fundamental significance for the embodiment of the civil rights work in the whole minority. In the course of 20 years since 1985 the office in Heidelberg – which was sponsored by the Federal government since August 1982 and since the year 2000 by the state Minister for Culture and Media – the Central Council, under the crucial leadership of Rose, brought about a significant change to the earlier discriminatory procedure of compensation for 3,200 Sinti and Roma Holocaust survivors.

See also 
 Documentation and Cultural Centre of German Sinti and Roma
 European Civil Rights Prize of the Sinti and Roma
European Roma Rights Centre

References

Further reading

External links
 
 
 
 

Human rights organisations based in Germany
Romani advocacy
Romani in Germany
Sinti in Germany
Organizations established in 1982
1982 establishments in Germany